PT Eka Sari Lorena Airlines – formerly trading as Lorena Air – was created to be an Indonesian airline which would use two Boeing 737-300 aircraft for scheduled flights from Jakarta to Palembang, Pekanbaru and Surabaya. It was to be based at Soekarno-Hatta International Airport, which existed between 2007 and 2009.  It never became operational.  Eka Sari Lorena Surbakti – daughter of the owner of bus operating company Lorena Group – was company CEO. The airline's owners claimed to be the first Indonesian airline with an integrated transport system.

References

External links
 Official website
 Lorena Air to Start Flying Jakarta-Surabaya in June
 MALAYSIA AIRLINES SEES US$298.8 MLN REVENUE FROM MRO BIZ BY 2010. AsiaPulse News. 06-DEC-2007
  	 MAS Sees RM1 Bln Revenue From MRO Business By 2010. Bernama. December 05, 2007 16:16 PM

Defunct airlines of Indonesia
Airlines established in 2007
Airlines disestablished in 2009